Joseph Méry (21 January 179717 June 1866) was a French writer, journalist, novelist, poet, playwright and librettist.

Career 
An ardent romanticist, he collaborated with Auguste Barthélemy in many of his satires and wrote a great number of stories, now forgotten. Nowadays he is perhaps best remembered as the co-librettist of the original version in French of Verdi's Don Carlos, which premiered in Paris in March 1867. Also, he was the author of the play La Bataille de Toulouse which Verdi had earlier adapted for his opera La battaglia di Legnano in January 1849.

He was noted in his time for his wit and ability to improvise. He produced several pieces at the Paris theatres, and also collaborated with Gérard de Nerval in adaptations from Shakespeare and in other plays. A friend of Offenbach, he wrote libretti for three of the composer's works.

His novella Histoire de ce qui n'est pas arrivé (1854) is a significant exercise in alternate history, in which Méry imagined that Napoleon's life took a different turn in Egypt in 1799. It was translated by Brian Stableford in 2012 and is available in a collection of Méry stories entitled The Tower of Destiny.

Alexandre Dumas, père, in 1864, invited all the poets of France to display their skill by composing to sets of Bouts-Rimés selected for the purpose by Joseph Méry. Later in life Méry received a pension from Napoleon III.

Works

Novels, short stories and prose 
 Le Quartier général des jésuites, ou la Ligue à Marseille et à Aix (1829)
 Le Bonnet vert (1830)
 L'Assassinat, scènes méridionales de 1815 (1832)
 Scènes de la vie italienne (2 volumes, 1837)
 Les Nuits de Londres (2 volumes, 1840)
 Un amour dans l'avenir (2 volumes, 1841) Text online 1 2
 Le Siège de Marseille par le connétable de Bourbon, chronique du XVIe (1841)
 Anglais et Chinois (1843) Text online
 La Comtesse Hortensia (1844)
 Héva (1844) Text online
 La Floride (1844) Text online
 L'Éden, mystère en 2 parties (1844)
 La Guerre du Nizam (1847)
 Un mariage de Paris (2 volumes, 1849)
 André Chénier (3 volumes, 1850)
 La Juive au Vatican, ou Amor e Roma (2 volumes, 1851) Text online
 Muses et fées. Histoire des femmes mythologiques, with Louis-Françoi Rabans (1851)
 Salons et souterrains de Paris (3 volumes, 1851)
 Trafalgar (4 volumes, 1852–1853)
 La Ferme de l'Orange (1853) Text online
 Le Dernier Fantôme (1853)
 Nouvelles nouvelles (1853) Text online
 Les Nuits anglaises, contes nocturnes (1853)
 Les Nuits italiennes, contes nocturnes (1853) Text online
 Les Nuits d'Orient, contes nocturnes (1854) Text online
 Les Nuits espagnoles (1854)
 Saint-Pierre de Rome (2 volumes, 1854) Text online 1 2
 Un amour dans le crime (2 volumes, 1854)
 Une histoire de famille (2 volumes, 1854)
 Le Paradis terrestre (2 volumes, 1855)
 Trois bluettes : Le Voile. La Pèlerine. Le Manchon (1855)
 Les Nuits parisiennes (1855)
 Histoire d'une colline (1855)
 Le Bonheur d'un millionnaire (1855)
 Le Château d'Udolphe (1855)
 Les Damnés de Java (3 volumes, 1855)
 Les Matinées du Louvre : paradoxes et rêveries, entretiens de salons (1855)
 Un carnaval de Paris (1856)
 Les Amants du Vésuve (1856)
 La Circé de Paris (2 volumes, 1856)
 Les Deux Amazones (1857)
 Ems et les bords du Rhin (1858)
 Monsieur Auguste (1859)
 Le Château vert (1859)
 Napoléon en Italie (1859)
 Le Château des trois tours (1860)
 Marseille et les Marseillais (1860) Text online
 Contes et nouvelles (1860) Text online
 Ursule (1860)
 Un crime inconnu (1861)
 Une nuit du midi (1862)
 La Comédie des animaux, histoire naturelle en action (1862)
 Les Amours des bords du Rhin (1864)
 Les Uns et les Autres (1864)
 La Vie fantastique (1864)
 La Prima Dona. Précédé du Bonheur des grandes artistes (1866)
 La Chasse au chastre (1860)
 Les Journées de Titus (1866) Text online
 La Vénus d'Arles (1866)
 Les Fleurs mystérieuses (1867)
 Le Château de la favorite (1874)
 Marthe la blanchisseuse. La Vénus d'Arles (1874) Text online
 La Cour d'amour (1875) Text online
 La Comtesse Adrienne (1876)

Poetry 
1836: Une revanche de Waterloo, ou Une partie d'échecs, poème héroï-comique
1847: L'Arbitre des jeux, accompagné de petits poèmes historiques, Paris, Gabriel de Gonet
1853: Mélodies poétiques
1858: Les Vierges de Lesbos, poème antique
1864: Poésies intimes, mélodies

Theatre 
1836: La Bataille de Toulouse, ou un Amour espagnol, three-act drama, in prose, Paris, Théâtre Beaumarchais, 11 April
1846: L'Univers et la Maison, comedy in 5 acts and in verse, Paris, Théâtre de l'Odéon, 3 November
1847: Le Quinze Janvier, ou Comédiens et parrains, comedy in one act and in verse, Paris, Théâtre de l'Odéon, 15 January
1847: Le Paquebot, comedy in 3 acts and in verse, Paris, Théâtre de l'Odéon, 4 April
1848: Le Vrai Club des femmes, comedy in 2 acts, in verse, Paris, Comédie-Française, 19 August
1850: Une veuve inconsolable, ou Planète et satellites, comédie en 4 actes et en prose, Paris, Théâtre de l'Odéon, 5 April
1851: Raphaël, historical comedy in 3 acts, in verse
1852: Le Sage et le Fou, three-act comedy, in verse, with Bernard Lopez, Paris, Théâtre-Français, 6 August
1853: Gusman le Brave, drama in 5 acts and in verse, Paris, Théâtre de l'Odéon, 19 September
1854: Aimons notre prochain, one-act parabole, in prose, Paris, Salle Herz, 2 May
1855: L'Essai du mariage, one-act comedy, in prose, Paris, Théâtre-Français, 6 March
1855: Frère et Sœur, five-act drama, with Bernard Lopez, Paris, Théâtre de l'Ambigu-Comique, 14 June
1858: Les Deux Frontins, one-act comedy, in verse, with Paul Siraudin, Paris, Théâtre-Français, 10 June
1864: La Fiancée aux millions, three-act comedy, in verse, with Bernard Lopez, Paris, Théâtre de Belleville, February
1861: Théâtre de salon : Après deux ans. La Coquette. Aimons notre prochain. Le Château en Espagne. Être présenté. La Grotte d'azur. Une veuve inconsolable Text online
1865: Nouveau théâtre de salon : La Comédie chez soi. Une éducation. Comédiens et diplomates. M. Rousseau. Gloire et amour. Le Récit de Théramène. La Soubrette de Clairon. Le Prix de famille Librettos 
1854: Ernest Reyer: Maître Wolfram, one-act opéra comique
1859: Félicien David: Herculanum, four-act opera
1860: Gioachino Rossini: Semiramide, four-act opera
1862: Ernest Reyer: Érostrate, two-act opera, with Émilien Pacini
1865: G. Duprez: Jeanne d'Arc, five-act opera, with prologue, with Édouard Duprez
1867: Giuseppe Verdi: Don Carlos, five-act opera, with Camille Du Locle

 Publications in collaboration with Auguste Barthélemy 
1825: Sidiennes, épîtres-satires sur le dix-neuvième siècle1826: Biographie des quarante de l'Académie française1826: Les Jésuites, épître à M. le président Séguier1826: La Villéliade ou la prise du château Rivoli. Poème héroï-comique en cinq chants Text online
1827: Une soirée chez M. de Peyronnet ou le seize avril. Scène dramatique1827: La Censure, scène historique1827: Rome à Paris, poème en 4 chants1827: Le Congrès des ministres, ou la Revue de la garde nationale : scènes historiques Text online
1827: Peyronnéide, épître à M. de Peyronnet1827: La Corbiéréide, poème en 4 chants  Text online
1827: La Bacriade, ou la Guerre d'Alger, poème héroï-comique en 5 chants1828: Napoléon en Égypte, poème en 8 chants1829: Le Fils de l'homme, ou Souvenirs de Vienne1829: Waterloo. Au général de Bourmont1830: L'Insurrection, poème dédié aux parisiens1831: Œuvres de Barthélemy et Méry1834: Les Aygalades et Fontainieu Publications in collaboration with Gérard de Nerval 
1850: Le Chariot d'enfant drama in verse, in 5 acts and 7 tableaux, traduction du drame indien du Roi Soudraka Text online
1852: L'Imagier de Harlem, ou la Découverte de l'imprimerie, drame-légende à grand spectacle, in 5 acts and 10 tableaux, in prose and in verse, with Gérard de Nerval and Bernard Lopez, ballets by Adrien Text online

 Bibliography 
Kilien Stengel, Les Poètes de la bonne chère, Anthologie de poésie gastronomique, Collection Petite Vermillon Éditions de la Table ronde (groupe Gallimard), 2008. 
Eugène de Mirecourt, Méry (1858) Text online
Gustave Claudin, Méry : sa vie intime, anecdotique et littéraire (1868) Text online

 See also 
 Antoine Rey-Dussueil
 A Correct Transcript of Pilate's Court, an American 1879 pamphlet by William Dennes Mahan plagiarized from Méry's  Ponce Pilate à Vienne''.

References

External links 
 
 
 

1797 births
1866 deaths
Writers from Marseille
19th-century French novelists
19th-century French poets
French opera librettists
19th-century French dramatists and playwrights
19th-century French journalists
French male novelists
French male poets
French male dramatists and playwrights
French male journalists
19th-century French male writers